Durand Township may refer to the following townships in the United States:

 Durand Township, Winnebago County, Illinois
 Durand Township, Beltrami County, Minnesota